William T. Webster (1909–?) was an English professional footballer who played as a winger.

Career statistics
Source:

References

1909 births
Footballers from Sunderland
English footballers
Association football wingers
Stockport County F.C. players
Bradford City A.F.C. players
Port Vale F.C. players
Accrington Stanley F.C. (1891) players
Gateshead F.C. players
Stalybridge Celtic F.C. players
Darlington Town F.C. players
English Football League players
Year of death missing